The Singapore men's national volleyball team is the men's national volleyball team of Singapore.
The Singapore men's national volleyball team represents Singapore in international men's volleyball competitions and friendly matches.

They qualified for the 1979 Asian Men's Volleyball Championship.

Current roster
Head Coach: Akihiko Narita
The following is the Singapore roster in the 2019 SEA Games.

Competition history

Southeast Asian Games
 1981 — Group Stage
 1983 — Group Stage
 1993 —  Bronze medal
 2015 — 8th place
 2019 — 7th place

References

External links
Volleyball Association of Singapore

National men's volleyball teams
Volleyball
Volleyball in Singapore